Conor Stone (born 22 April 2002) is an Australian rules footballer who plays for the Greater Western Sydney Giants in the Australian Football League (AFL). He was recruited by the Giants with the 15th draft pick in the 2020 AFL draft. He made his debut in the 30-point win against  at the Melbourne Cricket Ground in round four, 2021, in what was the Giants' first match at the ground since the 2019 AFL Grand Final. He wears guernsey number 18, which was vacated by Jeremy Cameron's departure to  during the 2020 off-season.

References

External links
 
 
 

2002 births
Living people
Greater Western Sydney Giants players
Australian rules footballers from Victoria (Australia)
Oakleigh Chargers players